Spirit: Stallion of the Cimarron is a soundtrack album and the ninth studio album by Bryan Adams and Hans Zimmer to the animated feature of the same name. The album was released on May 14, 2002 (see 2002 in music) and includes the European hit, "Here I Am".

Both the English and French versions of the album have Bryan Adams as the singer.

The German vocals were provided by Hartmut Engler, lead singer of the German pop band Pur.

Spanish vocals in the European version of the soundtrack were recorded by singer Raúl Malo.

Spanish vocals in the Latin version of the soundtrack were recorded by Mexican singer Erik Rubin.

Italian vocals in the Italian version of the soundtrack were recorded by singer Zucchero.

In Brazil, a Portuguese version of the soundtrack was recorded by Brazilian singer Paulo Ricardo.

In the Polish version vocals were provided by Maciej Balcar, lead singer of the blues rock band Dżem.

Track listing

Personnel 
 Bryan Adams – vocals, acoustic guitar, electric guitar, bass 
 Gavin Greenway – keyboards, programming 
 Steve Jablonsky – keyboards, programming 
 Patrick Leonard – keyboards, programming 
 Hans Zimmer – keyboards, programming 
 Mel Wesson – keyboards, programming, additional arrangements 
 Matt Mahaffey – keyboards (4), drums (4), backing vocals (4), whistling (4)
 Sarah McLachlan – acoustic piano (6), vocals (6)
 Heitor Pereira – acoustic guitar, electric guitar
 Davey Johnstone – electric guitar
 Keith Scott – guitars 
 David Channing – 12-string guitar 
 Mickey Curry – drums 
 Ashwin Sood – drums (4)
 Martin Tillman – electric cello 
 Craig Eastman – fiddle
 Tonia Davall – orchestra contractor
 Perry Montague-Mason – concertmaster 
 James Dooley – additional arrangements 
 Rupert Gregson-Williams – additional arrangements 
 The Pointless Brothers [Bryan Adams and Robert John "Mutt" Lange] – backing vocals

Certifications

References

Bryan Adams albums
2002 soundtrack albums
2000s film soundtrack albums
Universal Records soundtracks
Hans Zimmer soundtracks
Albums produced by Patrick Leonard
Albums produced by Jimmy Jam and Terry Lewis
Spirit: Stallion of the Cimarron